The Sun, Moon & Herbs is a 1971 studio album by New Orleans R&B artist Dr. John, noted for its contributions from Eric Clapton, Mick Jagger, and other well-known musicians. It was originally intended to be a three-album set but was cut down to a single disc. The album was described by James Chrispell on AllMusic as "dark and swampy" and "best listened to on a hot, muggy night with the sound of thunder rumbling off in the distance like jungle drums". The album was Dr. John's first album to reach the Billboard 200 charts, spending five weeks there and peaking at #184 on November 6, 1971.

Track listing

Personnel

Musicians
 Dr. John – vocals, piano, organ, guitar, vibes, percussion 
 Tommy Ferrone – rhythm guitar
 John Boudreaux – drums

The Memphis Horns

 Andrew Love – tenor saxophone
 Jack Hale, Sr. – trombone
 James Mitchell – baritone saxophone
 Ed Logan – tenor saxophone
 Roger Hopps – trumpet
 Wayne Jackson – trumpet, horn
(tracks 1, 2, 5)

Guest musicians
 Eric Clapton – slide guitar 
 Ronnie Barron – keyboards (track 4)
 Graham Bond – alto saxophone (track 1)
 Steve York – acoustic bass (tracks 5, 6)
 Jesse Boyce – bass (track 3), percussion (track 6)
 Carl Radle – Fender bass (tracks 2, 7)
 Ron Johnson – bass (track 4)
 Walter Davis Jr. – piano (tracks 1, 3, 5)
 Jim Gordon – percussion, conga (track 7)
 Vic Brox – pocket trumpet & organ
 Ray Draper – tuba, percussion & background vocals
 Chris Mercer – saxophone (tracks 1, 2, 7)
 Jerry Jumonville – saxophone (track 4)
 Bobby Keys – tenor saxophone (tracks 2, 7)
 Jim Price – trumpet (tracks 5, 7)
Edward R. Hoerner – trumpet (track 4)
 Kenneth Terroade – flute (tracks 1, 3, 5, 6)
 Calvin "Fuzzy" Samuels – percussion (track 5)
 Freeman Brown – percussion (track 3, 5, 6)
 Freddie Staehle – trap drums
 Mick Jagger (track 2), Doris Troy, Shirley Goodman, Tami Lynn, P. P. Arnold, Bobby Whitlock, Joni Jonz – backing vocals

Technical
 Dr. John – producer, arranger
 Charles Greene – producer
 Roy Thomas Baker – engineer
 Juddy Phillips – engineer (track 4)
 Albhy Galuten, Tom Dowd – remix engineers
 Howard Albert, Karl Richardson, Ron Albert – overdub engineers
 John Millerburg – design concept
 Gary Burgess – photography

References

1971 albums
Dr. John albums
Atlantic Records albums
Albums produced by Charles Greene (producer)
Albums recorded at Trident Studios